

The Joseph Raphael De Lamar House is a mansion at 233 Madison Avenue at the corner of 37th Street in the Murray Hill neighborhood of Manhattan, New York City. The house, currently the Consulate General of Poland, New York City, was built in 1902–1905 and was designed by C. P. H. Gilbert in the Beaux-Arts style. The De Lamar Mansion marked a stark departure from Gilbert's traditional style of French Gothic architecture and was instead robustly Beaux-Arts, heavy with rusticated stonework, balconies, and a colossal mansard roof. The mansion is the largest in Murray Hill, and one of the most spectacular in the city; the interiors are as lavish as the exterior.

History 
Joseph Raphael De Lamar was a Dutch-born merchant seaman who made his first fortune in mining and metallurgy during the 1870s-80s silver-lead rushes to Colorado and Idaho, and 1890s gold strikes at Mercur, Utah and Delamar, Nevada. He had this residence built as his entrée into New York society. It was to be a family residence, but soon after it was built De Lamar and his wife divorced. The 1910 census taker found De Lamar in residence with his daughter Alice, by then 15, and nine servants, a typical ratio for the time. De Lamar died eight years later in 1918 at the age of 75. His obituary in The Boston Daily Globe described him as a "man of mystery" and an accomplished organist. He left an estate worth $29 million (equal to $ in ) to his daughter, who continued living in the house for a short time before moving to an apartment at 740 Park Avenue.

The mansion was sold to the American Bible Society. In 1923 the National Democratic Club purchased it for its headquarters. 

In 1973, the Republic of Poland bought the mansion for $900,000 (equal to $ in ) to house its Consulate General in New York. The interior has been thoroughly cleaned and renovated and retains all of its many period features. Since 2008 the consulate has also been regularly illuminated at night.

The De Lamar Mansion was designated a landmark by the New York City Landmarks Preservation Commission in 1975, and was added to the National Register of Historic Places in 1983.

Gallery

See also
 National Register of Historic Places listings in Manhattan from 14th to 59th Streets
 List of New York City Designated Landmarks in Manhattan from 14th to 59th Streets

References
Notes

Further reading

External links 

1905 establishments in New York City
Beaux-Arts architecture in New York City
C. P. H. Gilbert buildings
Houses completed in 1905
Houses in Manhattan
Madison Avenue
Murray Hill, Manhattan
New York City Designated Landmarks in Manhattan
Second Empire architecture in New York City
Gilded Age mansions